Aihen Muñoz Capellán (born 16 August 1997) is a Spanish professional footballer who plays for Real Sociedad. Mainly a left-back, he can also play as a winger.

Club career
Born in Etxauri, Navarre, Muñoz was a Real Sociedad youth graduate. Promoted to farm team CD Berio FT in July 2015, he made his senior debut during the campaign, in Tercera División.

For the 2017–18 season, Muñoz was promoted to the reserves in Segunda División B. He made his professional – and La Liga – debut on 6 January 2019, starting in a 2–0 away win against Real Madrid.

On 23 April 2019, Muñoz renewed his contract until 2022, and was definitely promoted to the main squad on 9 June.

International career
He made his debut for the unofficial Basque Country national team in May 2019, in a 0–0 draw away to Panama for which a small, youthful and inexperienced squad was selected.

Career statistics

Club

Honours 
Real Sociedad
 Copa del Rey: 2019–20

References

External links
Profile at the Real Sociedad website

1997 births
Living people
People from Cuenca de Pamplona
Spanish footballers
Footballers from Navarre
Association football defenders
La Liga players
Segunda División B players
Tercera División players
Real Sociedad C footballers
Real Sociedad B footballers
Real Sociedad footballers
Basque Country international footballers